Hawla Indoor Stadium  is indoor stadium in  Aizawl, Mizoram, India.  It is used mainly for Basketball league Mizoram Super League .

Stadium

The stadium has a  seating capacity of about 3,000 spectators. The First Floor of the Stadium can be used for Basketball and Badminton while the ground floor has Gymnasium. The Basement has facilities for Martial Arts and Table Tennis.
Mizoram Super League, India's first-ever professional basketball league is played in this stadium.

History
This Stadium was inaugurated by Pu R Lalzirliana, Home Minister of Mizoram on 19 March 2012. The construction of this stadium started in 2008. Hawla Indoor Stadium was one of the venues for the Northeast India Games.

References

Aizawl
Sports venues in Mizoram
Indoor arenas in India
Basketball venues in India
2012 establishments in Mizoram
Sports venues completed in 2012